Skeletons in the Closet is an upcoming American horror film directed by Asif Akbar and starring Terrence Howard and Cuba Gooding Jr.

Cast
Terrence Howard
Cuba Gooding Jr.
Clifton Powell
Valery M. Ortiz
Udo Kier
Sally Kirkland
Louis Mandylor

Production
Lance Kawas was initially to have helmed the film; he left the project due to creative differences and was replaced by Asif Akbar.  Filming began in Las Vegas in February 2022.

In March 25, 2022, it was announced that filming wrapped.

References

External links
 

Upcoming films
American horror films
Films shot in the Las Vegas Valley